Gary Chivichyan (born July 17, 1996) is an Armenian-American professional basketball player who plays for the Seattle Super Hawks of the TBL. He became the first Armenian ever to be drafted when he was chosen with the 7th pick in the second round of the 2021 NBA G League draft. Gary Chivichyan was also the first Armenian to be nominated for an ESPN ESPYS award. He played for the Pacific Tigers, led by former NBA star Damon Stoudamire.

College career
Nicknamed the "Armenian Sniper", he was one of the most prolific long-range shooters in Idaho State history, ranking fourth all-time in made three-point field goals (175) and three-point attempts (433), while finishing seventh all-time with a 40.4 three-point field goal percentage. He sank 62 three pointers in 2018–19 while shooting 41.1 percent from beyond the arc, and averaged 2.1 made three-pointers per game, while shooting 41.8 percent from the field for his career, and 70.3 from the free throw line.

Chivichyan was ranked sixth in the West Coast Conference in threes per game (1.88) and fourth on the team with a .387 three-point percentage while with the Tigers. He was the second leading scorer on a deep 13 man roster team and made 32 appearances as a tiger while shooting 38.3 percent from the floor. Known for his timely perimeter shooting, he sank a deep three to force a third overtime in an instant classic against Saint Mary's (1/4) as part of a season-high 19-point performance.

Professional career

Stockton Kings (2021)
After going undrafted in the 2020 NBA draft, Chivichyan was selected 35th overall by the Lakeland Magic in the 2021 NBA G League draft and subsequently traded to the Iowa Wolves. However he was waived on November 4. On November 22, he signed with the Stockton Kings, but was waived on December 6 after one game.

Agua Caliente Clippers (2021)
Three days later, he was claimed off waivers by the Agua Caliente Clippers. He was then later waived on January 30, 2022.

Return to Agua Caliente Clippers (2022)
On February 23, 2022, Chivichyan was reacquired via available player pool by the Agua Caliente Clippers. He was then later waived on February 28, 2022.

National team career
Chivichyan plays for the Armenia national basketball team.

Personal life
Chivichyan's father is Gokor Chivichyan a judo, submission grappling, and mixed martial arts instructor who has trained Ronda Rousey, Karo Parisyan, Manvel Gamburyan and others. His brother is a former National Judo Champion and professor at USC, Arthur Chivichyan.

References

External links
https://www.forbes.com/sites/shamahyder/2021/03/04/what-armenias-rising-basketball-star-can-teach-us-about-building-a-brand/?sh=351fc72956f4*
https://in.news.yahoo.com/gary-chivichyan-armenia-rising-basketball-150341256.html
https://en.armradio.am/2020/04/08/rising-basketball-star-gary-chivichyan-planning-to-be-first-armenian-in-nba/
https://www.espn.com/mens-college-basketball/player/_/id/3946030/gary-chivichyan
https://pacifictigers.com/sports/mens-basketball/roster/gary--chivichyan/3397
https://www.sports-reference.com/cbb/players/gary-chivichyan-1.html

1996 births
Living people
Agua Caliente Clippers players
American men's basketball players
Armenian men's basketball players
Basketball players from Los Angeles
Guards (basketball)
Idaho State Bengals men's basketball players
Pacific Tigers men's basketball players
Stockton Kings players